The 1939 Texas Tech vs. Centenary football game was an American college football game played between the Texas Tech Red Raiders and Centenary Gentlemen on November 11, 1939, at Centenary College Stadium in Shreveport, Louisiana.  In "one of the weirdest games in NCAA History," torrential downpour and muddy field conditions prevented either Texas Tech or Centenary from advancing the ball by running or passing.  To cope with the conditions, both teams resorted to repetitive and immediate punting. Both teams combined to punt 77 times. With each punt, both teams hoped to recover a fumble at the other end of the field.

6 of 14 fumbles were lost, but none of the turnovers led to a score. 42 punts were returned, 19 went out of bounds, 10 were downed, 1 went into the end zone for a touchback, 4 were blocked, and 1 was fair caught. 67 punts (34 by Texas Tech, 33 by Centenary) occurred on first down, including 22 consecutively in the third and fourth quarters. The game ended in a 0–0 tie with Centenary owning a statistical edge with 31 yards of total offense compared with a one-yard loss for Texas Tech.

Historical significance
The 1939 Texas Tech vs Centenary game is referenced in the 2013 edition of the NCAA Football Records Book 14 times. More NCAA single-game records (13 total) were set in the 1939 Texas Tech vs Centenary game than any other game played in NCAA history. Steve Boda, a former associate director of NCAA statistics, researched the record in 1987. Stunned by the brief wire-service report of the game, he used a play-by-play account to confirm the details. All NCAA records set during the game have remained unbroken. Boda claims three modern football factors guard against a repeat of these records: Better field surfaces, easier to handle footballs, and advanced gloves and footwear.

NCAA records

Individual records

Team records

NCAA Records Reference (Last referenced for 2013 season)

References

1939 college football season
vs. Texas Tech 1939
vs. Centenary 1939
November 1939 sports events
1939 in sports in Louisiana